Sir John Stoughton Bloomfield  (9 October 1901 – 30 June 1989) was an Australian politician.

He was born in Toorak to accountant Arthur stoughton Bloomfield and Ada Victoria McGuigan. He attended Geelong Grammar School before entering Trinity College in 1921 while studying at Melbourne University, where he received a Bachelor of Law. He practised as a solicitor from 1927, and on 21 March 1931 married Beatrice Madge Taylor, with whom he had two children. During World War II he served in the AIF in the Middle East and New Guinea, rising to the rank of lieutenant-colonel. On his return he was called to the bar. A member of the Liberal and Country Party, he was elected to the Victorian Legislative Assembly in 1953 in a by-election for the seat of Malvern. In 1955 he joined the frontbench as Minister of Labour and Industry and of Electrical Undertakings, but he soon moved to the Education portfolio in February 1956, where he remained for eleven years. He took silk in 1965 and was knighted on his retirement from the frontbench in 1967. Bloomfield retired in 1970 and died in 1989.

References

1901 births
1989 deaths
Liberal Party of Australia members of the Parliament of Victoria
Members of the Victorian Legislative Assembly
Australian King's Counsel
Australian Knights Bachelor
20th-century Australian politicians
People educated at Geelong Grammar School
People educated at Trinity College (University of Melbourne)
Australian Army personnel of World War II
Australian colonels